The white desert snail, scientific name Eremarionta immaculata, is a species of air-breathing land snail, a terrestrial pulmonate gastropod mollusc in the family Helminthoglyptidae. This species is endemic to the United States.

References

Further reading 
 William D. Wiesenborn & Steven Goldsmith. 2003. WHITE DESERTSNAIL, EREMARIONTA IMMACULATA (GASTROPODA: PULMONATA), ACTIVITY DURING DAYLIGHT AFTER WINTER RAINFALL. The Southwestern Naturalist 48(2):202-207.

Eremarionta
Molluscs of the United States
Gastropods described in 1937
Taxonomy articles created by Polbot